Xfinity Live! Philadelphia (known as Philly Live! during planning and construction) is a dining and entertainment complex located at the corner of 11th and Pattison Avenue in the South Philadelphia Sports Complex on the former site of the Spectrum. It has become a media hub for various live broadcasts.

Xfinity Live! is the home of five restaurant and entertainment venues including, Victory Beer Hall, PBR: A Coors Banquet Bar, Broad Street Bullies Pub, 1100 Social and NBC Sports Arena. The district also features an outdoor plaza that is home to the Miller Lite Concert Stage. Often called “Philly's fourth stadium”, the venue has invested over $150 million in original design as well as renovations over the years.

History
Starting in 2008, Comcast Spectacor and Cordish Company partnered for the proposed Art Nouveau design, making use of neon- and LED-lighting to accent structures and walkways. The original Philly Live! concept included an assortment of restaurants with outdoor seating, a hotel along Pattison Avenue, and a spa or health club. In December 2011, Cordish  and Comcast Spectacor announced renaming and reinventing the project as Xfinity Live!.

Construction began in the summer of 2011, and the first phase opened in late March 2012 as Xfinity Live!. The development concept was redrawn as a dining and entertainment district. Main attractions of the complex include the NBC Sports Arena and its 32-foot HDTV.

Venues

NBC Sports Arena 
The first of its kind, NBC Sports Arena is the largest of the five venues inside Xfinity Live! At 32-feet tall, the venue holds one of the largest high definition televisions on the East Coast. The sports bar, in partnership with NBC Sports, offers bar food and a unique viewing experience for all major sporting events. NBC Sports Arena also holds two of Philadelphia's most popular food options: Chickie's & Pete's and Geno's Steaks.

1100 Social

Broad St. Bullies

PBR Bar and Grill Philly

Victory Beer Hall

Former Venues

Spectrum Grill

Philly Marketplace

X Bar

References

External links

The Cordish Companies Official Site

2012 establishments in Pennsylvania
Commercial buildings completed in 2012
Companies based in Philadelphia
 
Concert halls
Drinking establishments in Pennsylvania
Economy of Philadelphia
Entertainment companies of the United States
Restaurants in Philadelphia
South Philadelphia
The Cordish Companies